The 1997 World Table Tennis Championships – Swaythling Cup (men's team) was the 44th edition of the men's team championship.

China won the gold medal defeating France 3–1 in the final. South Korea won the bronze medal defeating Germany in the bronze medal play off.

Medalists

Final stage knockout phase

Quarter finals

Semifinals

Third-place playoff

Final

See also
 List of World Table Tennis Championships medalists

References

-